Yuri Ivanovich Kis (born 7 April 1962) is a retired Russian breaststroke swimmer. He won two gold medals at the 1981 European Aquatics Championships and a silver medal in the 4×100 m medley relay at the 1982 World Aquatics Championships. He won the national championships in the 100 m breaststroke in 1980 and 1983 and finished second in 200 m in 1982.

After retiring from swimming he worked as a swimming instructor in Moscow.

References

1962 births
Living people
Kazakhstani male breaststroke swimmers
Soviet male breaststroke swimmers
World Aquatics Championships medalists in swimming
European Aquatics Championships medalists in swimming
Universiade medalists in swimming
Universiade silver medalists for the Soviet Union
Medalists at the 1983 Summer Universiade
People from Temirtau